1981 Football Championship of Ukrainian SSR was the 51st season of association football competition of the Ukrainian SSR, which was part of the Soviet Second League in Zone 5. The season started on 4 April 1981.

The 1981 Football Championship of Ukrainian SSR was won by Kryvbas Kryvyi Rih. Qualified for the interzonal playoffs, the team from Dnipropetrovsk Oblast did not manage to gain promotion by placing second in its group.

The "Ruby Cup" of Molod Ukrayiny newspaper (for the most scored goals) was received by Kryvbas Kryvyi Rih.

Teams

Location map

Promoted teams
Kolos Mezhyrich – Champion of the Fitness clubs competitions (KFK) (debut)

Renamed teams
 Vuhlyk Horlivka was called Shakhtar Horlivka
 Shakhtar Stakhanov was called Stakhanovets Stakhanov

Final standings

Top goalscorers
The following were the top ten goalscorers.

See also
 Soviet Second League

Notes

External links
 1981 Soviet Second League, Zone 6 (Ukrainian SSR football championship). Luhansk football portal
 1981 Soviet championships (all leagues) at helmsoccer.narod.ru

1981
3
Soviet
Soviet
football
Football Championship of the Ukrainian SSR